The 1977 Benson & Hedges Championships, also known as the Wembley Championships, was a men's tennis tournament played on indoor carpet courts at the Wembley Arena in London, England that was part of the 1977 Colgate-Palmolive Grand Prix. It was the second edition of the tournament and was held from 14 November until 18 November 1977. First-seeded Björn Borg won the singles title.

Finals

Singles
 Björn Borg defeated  John Lloyd 6–4, 6–4, 6–3
 It was Borg's 11th singles title of the year and the 30th of his career.

Doubles
 Frew McMillan /  Sandy Mayer defeated  Brian Gottfried /  Raúl Ramírez 6–3, 7–6

References

External links
 ITF tournament edition details

Benson and Hedges Championships
Wembley Championships
Benson and Hedges Championships
Benson and Hedges Championships
Benson and Hedges Championships
Tennis in London